Bárbara de Regil (born in Mexico City, Mexico), is a Mexican actress. She debuted on television in the telenovela Bajo el alma. Her most famous character to date is Rosario, in the Mexican adaptation of the Colombian action-thriller series of the same name, Rosario Tijeras (2016–2019) from Sony Pictures Television and TV Azteca. On November 5, 2020, it was reported that she had joined the cast of the crime action film 'Blackout' opposite Josh Duhamel, Abbie Cornish, Nick Nolte and Omar Chaparro. In April 2021, it was announced that De Regil would star as the main lead in the romcom television series Parientes a la fuerza on Telemundo, the Spanish-language network subsidiary of NBC Universal. The series began airing on October 26, 2021.

Personal life 
De Regil is the cousin of Mexican broadcaster and presenter Marco Antonio Regil. She had a daughter at age 15. In 2017, she married attorney and real estate developer Fernando Schoenwald.

Filmography

Film roles

Television roles

References

External links 
 

Living people
21st-century Mexican actresses
Actresses from Mexico City
Mexican film actresses
Mexican telenovela actresses
Mexican television actresses
Year of birth missing (living people)